The Provisional Government Commission of the Grand Duchy of Lithuania; also, the Lithuanian Provisional Governing Commission (Polish: Komisja Rządu Tymczasowego Wielkiego Księstwa Litewskiego; also Komisja Rządząca Tymczasowa Litewska; French: le Gouvernement provisoire de Lituanie; also Gouvernement général de la Lituanie, Lithuanian Lietuvos laikinosios vyriausybės komisija) was a provisional administrative body for the Grand Duchy of Lithuania, which had been overtaken by Napoleon's Grand Army during the 1812 French invasion of Russia. On 14 July 1812 the Commission formally joined the General Confederation of the Kingdom of Poland, creating the united Kingdom of Poland.

History

The Commission was established on 1 July 1812 by order of French Emperor Napoleon Bonaparte. Its chief tasks included the creation of Lithuanian armed forces, and the provisioning of Napoleon's troops. The provinces of Vilnius, Grodno, Minsk and Białystok were attached to the jurisdiction of the government of Lithuania. The Provisional Government of Lithuania had no connections to Poland.

Supervision of the Commission was entrusted to the former French Resident in the Duchy of Warsaw, Commissioner Louis Pierre Édouard Bignon. Actual power, however, was exercised by Dutch General Dirk van Hogendorp, former governor of Java, who was appointed governor of Vilnius.

Napoleon, contrary to the hopes reposed in him by the General Confederation of the Kingdom of Poland, had not restored Polish statehood to the former Polish–Lithuanian lands.  He had merely established, in the conquered territories, a provisional administration, thereby sidestepping final dispositions pending his further conquest of Russia.

Józef Wybicki, sent on 11 July 1812 to Vilnius with a deputation from the Council of the General Confederation, unsuccessfully attempted to get the Emperor to declare the restoration of the Kingdom of Poland, including the territories that had been annexed in the Partitions of Poland. Napoleon also refused to attach the military units consisting of Lithuanians to the Polish ones.

Only on 14 July 1812 the Commission formally joined the General Confederation of the Kingdom of Poland, creating the united Kingdom of Poland.

After Russian troops invaded Lithuanian territory at the end of 1812, the Commission acted outside Lithuania.

Presidents 

 Józef Sierakowski (to July 18, 1812)
 Stanisław Sołtan (to August 24, 1812)
 Dirk van Hogendorp (to September 1812)
 Stanisław Sołtan (to September 1813)

Secretary General: Józef Ignacy Kossakowski

Members 
 Louis Pierre Édouard, Baron Bignon

 Aleksander Stanisław Potocki
 
 Aleksander Antoni Sapieha
 Jan Śniadecki

References

Sources 
 Janusz Iwaszkiewicz, Litwa w roku 1812 (Lithuania in 1812), Warsaw, 1912.
 Marian Kukiel, Wojna 1812 roku (The 1812 War), Kraków, 1937.
 A. Rembowski, "Konfederacja Generalna i pospolite ruszenie w roku 1812" ("The General Confederation and Levee en Masse in 1812"), Biblioteka Warszawska (The Warsaw Library), vol. 1, 1896, fascicle 3, pp. 478–514; vol. 2, 1896, fascicle 1, pp. 67–86.
 Władysław Zajewski, Józef Wybicki, Warsaw, 1983.

Duchy of Warsaw
History of Lithuania (1795–1918)
1812 in Belarus
French invasion of Russia
Provisional governments
1812 in Europe